Nefertiti y Aquenatos (English: Nefertiti and Akhenaten) is a 1973 Mexican television short film directed by Raúl Araiza. The film stars Geraldine Chaplin as Nefertiti, Salah Zulfikar as Horemheb and John Gavin as Akhenaten. The film was produced  by Telesistema Mexicano S.A.

Primary cast 

 Geraldine Chaplin as Nefertiti
 Salah Zulfikar as Horemheb
 John Gavin as Akhenaten
 Norma Jordan

See also 
 Short film
 1973 in film
 Mexican cinema
 Salah Zulfikar filmography

References

External links 

 

1973 films
Mexican short films
Films set in ancient Egypt
Films set in the 14th century BC
Mexican television films